The Pârâul Rece (also: Hideg, Râul Rece) is a right tributary of the river Timiș in Romania. It discharges into the Timiș near Rusca.

References

Rivers of Romania
Rivers of Caraș-Severin County